The Defiant Ones is a four-part American television documentary series, directed by Allen Hughes, that aired on HBO from July 9 to July 12, 2017. It  focuses on the careers of and partnership between Jimmy Iovine and Dr. Dre, co-founders of Beats Electronics.

Synopsis
The four-part documentary examines the partnership between Jimmy Iovine and Dr. Dre and their leading roles in a chain of transformative events in contemporary culture through interviews with the men themselves and others who were involved. Some scenarios are broadly reenacted.

Cast

Interviews
Jimmy Iovine
Dr. Dre
Trent Reznor
Alonzo Williams
Ice Cube
Patti Smith
Bruce Springsteen
Bono
Sean Combs
Kendrick Lamar
Nas
Stevie Nicks
Tom Petty
Snoop Dogg
Will.i.am
Eminem
Gwen Stefani
The D.O.C.
Dee Barnes
Dj Yella
MC Ren

Reenactments
Gregory Schwabe as FBI Agent
Mark Anthony Petrucelli as David Kenner

Episodes

Part 1
Years before they sell their Beats headphone company to Apple Inc. for US $3 billion (the largest acquisition in Apple's history), Dr. Dre and Jimmy Iovine's music careers begin on opposite coasts with nothing but a little ambition, many frustrating setbacks, and a few good breaks — allowing each to show the world their talent for producing hits.

Part 2
NWA skyrockets to success with provocative recordings like "Fuck tha Police" but tragedies, ego and money conflicts eventually leave Dr. Dre on his own.  Meanwhile, Jimmy Iovine finds his own mix of huge hits and personal battles while producing Tom Petty, Stevie Nicks, and U2.

Part 3
Jimmy Iovine co-founds Interscope Records and signs edgy artists like Nine Inch Nails and Dr. Dre, whose 1992 album The Chronic helps ignite a national, political firestorm over gangster rap lyrics and free speech. Simultaneously, Dre, Snoop Dogg, and Tupac Shakur get in a violent feud with East Coast rivals.

Part 4
Dr. Dre and Jimmy Iovine strike gold with Eminem and others, but Napster and digital piracy threaten to destroy the music business. Desperate for alternatives and facing hard personal times, Jimmy and Dre create Beats Electronics which leads to a historic 2014 megadeal with Apple Inc., forever sealing their legacies.

Release
The documentary aired on HBO on four consecutive nights from July 9 to July 12, 2017, and was also made available in its entirety for streaming on Blu-ray. The DVD/Blu-ray release was eventually pressed by Universal Pictures Home Entertainment. It was given a TV-MA rating, meaning that it may be unsuitable for children under the age of 17.

On February 9, 2018, Netflix announced it had acquired the exclusive distribution rights to the series in all territories outside of the United States and Canada. The streaming service premiered the series in their acquired territories on March 23, 2018, listing it under their "Netflix Original Series" banner.

Soundtrack
The soundtrack to the documentary was released on Interscope Records, under license from Universal Music Enterprises.

Editing
Critics have praised the limited series for its groundbreaking picture editing by Doug Pray and Lasse Järvi. Aside from its “fast pace and entertaining design,”  the series has been noted especially for its editorial use of reaction shots, where interviewees appear to be silently engaged, as dialogue plays underneath, a technique they named “The Empathy Cut.”

Reception
The documentary received generally positive reviews. Jon Caramanica of The New York Times called it "glossy, rapidly-paced, ambitious and often fun" as well as "impressively lush and well-resourced" in his positive review. Lorraine Ali of the Los Angeles Times wrote that "the decades of struggle and successes leading up to" the deal with Apple "make this four-part series stand out in the crowded field of music docs" in her positive review. Jem Aswad of Variety.com wrote that the documentary "tells a compelling story and tells it effectively and well, but its bloated length is a bit hard to justify."

Awards
The Defiant Ones won the 2017 Grammy Award for Best Music Film and the IDA Award for Best Limited Series.  The series also garnered five Emmy Award nominations (Outstanding Documentary or Nonfiction Series, Picture Editing for a Nonfiction Program, Sound Editing for a Nonfiction Program, Sound Mixing for a Nonfiction Program, Writing for a Nonfiction Program) and an ACE Eddie nomination for Best Edited Documentary. Director Allen Hughes won the NAACP Award for Outstanding Direction in a Documentary. Editors Doug Pray and Lasse Järvi won an HPA Award for Outstanding Editing (Television over 30 minutes).

References

External links
 

2010s American documentary television series
Documentary films about the music industry
Documentary television series about music
Rockumentaries
English-language television shows
Films directed by the Hughes brothers
HBO documentary films
Dr. Dre
Grammy Award for Best Long Form Music Video